Le Goulet is a formerly incorporated village in Gloucester County, New Brunswick, Canada. Located several kilometres east-southeast of downtown Shippagan, it sits on the Gulf of St. Lawrence.

History

The village was originally called New Jerusalem Settlement when it was initially settled in 1879. Le Goulet was incorporated in 1986.

On 1 January 2023, Le Goulet amalgamated with the town of Shippagan and all or part of seven local service districts to form the new town of Shippagan. The community's name remains in official use.

Demographics 

Language

Notable people

See also
List of communities in New Brunswick

References

External links
Village de Le Goulet (FR)

Communities in Gloucester County, New Brunswick
Former villages in New Brunswick